Barislovci (sometimes Barislavci) is a small settlement on the left bank of the Polskava River in the Municipality of Videm south of Ptuj in eastern Slovenia. The area traditionally belonged to the Styria region. It is now included in the Drava Statistical Region.

The local church is dedicated to the Holy Family and belongs to the Parish of Sveti Vid pri Ptuju. It was built in 1904 in the Neo-Gothic style.

References

External links
Barislovci on Geopedia

Populated places in the Municipality of Videm